Giuseppe Caglioti (born in Naples on August 19, 1931) is an Italian physicist, academic, researcher and writer. He is an Emeritus Professor of Physics of Matter at the Polytechnic University of Milan. Caglioti is an Effective Member of the Istituto Lombardo Accademia di Scienze e Lettere, Emeritus Fellow of the World Academy of Art and Science and of the Italian Physical Society and member of the Istituto di Studi Superiori Gerolamo Cardano.

Career

Caglioti graduated in Physics at the University of Rome La Sapienza in 1953, and specialized at the same university in Nuclear Physics (1955), and at the Argonne National Laboratory, Illinois, USA, in Nuclear Science and Engineering (1956). Assistant at the Physics Institute of University of Rome (1953-1955), then researcher at the National Nuclear Energy Committee (CNEN then ENEA) of Italy (1955–70). In this position, Caglioti has been resident research associate at the Argonne National Laboratory (1956–57), the Atomic Energy of Canada Ltd. (AECL), Chalk River, Canada (1959), at the Joint Research Centre of the European Union, Ispra. Italy (1959–71), and intermittently (1966-1973) visiting professor at the Brookhaven National Laboratory and Stony Brook University, NY, USA. Caglioti has been Full Professor of solid state physics (1970-2006), and Director of the Institute (now Department) of Nuclear Engineering at the Polytecnic University of Milan; Emeritus Professor from 2006.

Research

Caglioti’s original research interests have been addressed to experimental basic and applied nuclear physics, neutron spectroscopy, and the study of the structure and mechanical performance of materials. In these areas, Caglioti has been the author/co-author of about 130 scientific publications, mostly in international journals or books. Starting from the eighties, his interests have shifted toward technological research (one patent on extra-light automobile wheels) and the development of the Piezo-MusiColor Project: a synergetic combination of science, technology and art (one patent on MusiColor) aiming to an interactive, synaesthesic enjoyment of music and sounds also by blind, deaf and hard-of-hearing persons.

Along these cross-disciplinary research lines, Caglioti has explored the concept of symmetry breaking as a common feature in science and art, and the connection between quantum physics and perception. These investigations have been the subject of about 50 papers on correlations between human and natural sciences, of a good number of popular books, and of a graduate course on Aesthetics – Scientific Components of Harmony and Beauty, held for many year (2003-2010) at the Faculty of Design, Polytechnic University of Milan

Awards and honors
1963 Physics Prize of the Italian Physical Society
1978 Gold Medal for Physical Sciences of the Academy of the Forty,  Italy
2005 Gold Medal of the National Academy of Lincei, Italy

Books

As author

 Giuseppe Caglioti: Introduzione alla fisica dei materiali (Zanichelli, Bologna, 1974) 
 Giuseppe Caglioti: Simmetrie infrante nella scienza e nell'arte (Città Studi, Milan, first edition 1983; second edition 1994)
 Giuseppe Caglioti: Symmetriebrechung und Wahrnehmung - Beispiele aus der Erfahrungswelt, with a preface by Hermann Haken (Friedr. Vieweg & Sohn Verlagsgesellschaft mbH, Braunschweig 1990)
 Giuseppe Caglioti: The Dynamics of Ambiguity, with a Preface by Hermann Haken (Springer, 1992); Japanese edition with a preface by K. Husimi (Kodansha, 1997); Russian edition, with a preface by Ilya Prigogine (MIR, 1998).
 Giuseppe Caglioti: Eidos e psiche, Struttura della materia e dinamica dell’immagine, with a preface by Giuseppe Pontiggia (Ilisso, Nuoro 1995); Japanese edition (Yakuyosha Co., 2001)
 Giuseppe Caglioti: Casanova e la scienza (Moretti e Vitali Ed,, Bergamo 1998)
G. Caglioti, F.G. Bassani e J. Ziman (Eds.), Theory of Condensed Matter (IAEA, Vienna, 1968)
Giuseppe Caglioti, Tatiana V. Tchouvileva and Luigi Cocchiarella, Odi et amo. Ambiguità percettive e pensiero quantistico, with a Preface by Giorgio Benedek and a Postface by Vittorino Andreoli (Mimesis Edizioni, Milano 2021).

As editor

G. Caglioti (Ed.), Atomic Structure and Mechanical Properties of Metals (North Holland, Amsterdam,1976)
G. Caglioti e A. Ferro Milone (Eds), Mechanical and thermal behaviour of metallic materials (North Holland, Amsterdam 1982)
G. Caglioti, H. Haken e L. Lugiato (Eds.), Synergetics and Dynamic Instabilities, (North Holland, Amsterdam, 1988)
Paolo Bisogno e Giuseppe Caglioti (Eds.), Scienza ed Arte, Prometheus 11 (Franco Angeli, Milano 1991)
G. Caglioti, T. Mohri and E Evangelisti (Eds.) The Challenge of Magnesium Alloys, Metallurgical Science and Technology, vol. 16 n. 1-2 (1998)
Giuseppe Caglioti (Ed.), Componenti scientifiche dell’armonia e del bello (Istituto Lombardo Accademia di Scienze e Lettere, Milano, 2001)
P. Bisogno, D. Bruni, G. Caglioti (Eds.), Immagini e conoscenza (Franco Angeli, Milano, 2001)

References 

1931 births
Living people
Italian physicists
Italian scientists
Academic staff of the Polytechnic University of Milan